The Rand Show, previously known as the Rand Easter Show, is an annual show held in Johannesburg, South Africa, and is the largest consumer exhibition in Southern Africa. It has been an important event in the city for many years, attracting in excess of 400,000 visitors in 2007. It was also called the Grand Rand Show, when it was held a few weeks outside of Easter in the late 1980s.

There were no shows in 2020-21 due to COVID-19 restrictions on major events. The next event is scheduled for 6 to 10 April 2023. Besides the Great Boer War, other cancellations occurred in 1915-18 & 1940-45.

History
The show was first held at the Old Wanderers cricket ground in November 1894 by the Witwatersrand Agricultural Society, a society that had formed in March of the same year. The second show was opened by Paul Kruger on 13 March 1895, at a venue called Milner Park, which is today the site of the University of the Witwatersrand's West Campus.  It was held again in 1896 and reestablished subsequent to the end of the Anglo Boer War, in 1907. In 1936, the Rand Show was called the Empire Exhibition.

The eleven-day show was historically an agricultural exhibition for all South Africans where livestock, poultry, yearlings, farm products and equipment were shown and judged with prizes awarded in the form of Gold and Silver medals. In later years it also featured industrial and commercial exhibitions and would eventually attract foreign participants who would exhibit country pavilions. Other annual exhibitors included Military Tattoos, the South African Defence Force, the South African Police as well as show-jumping competitions. The 1960 show was the site of a failed assassination attempt on Prime Minister Hendrik Verwoerd, by white farmer David Pratt.

Venue after 1984
It continued to be held at Milner Park until 1984, when it was moved to the Expo Centre at Nasrec, and the brand was sold in 2000 to company Kagiso Exhibitions & Events, a subsidiary of Kagiso Media.

In 2009, the Rand Show was to have moved to Gallagher Estate, with a separate Joburg Easter Festival being held at the Nasrec Expo Centre, however, the Expo Centre bought the Rand Show brand back from Kagiso, and the Rand Show was held, as normal, at Nasrec, as the Joburg Easter Festival, incorporating the Rand Show.

In 2009, the show, branded as the Rand Show and subtitled Joburg's Easter Festival, was again held at Nasrec, and the 2011 Rand Show scheduled to take place from 22 April to 2 May 2011.

The 2012 event ran from 6 April 2012 to 15 April 2012. The 2013 event of the Rand Show ran from 28 March 2013 to 1 April 2013. The 2014 event was hosted again at NASREC from 18 April 2014 to 28 April 2014. The 2015 Rand Show ran from 3 April 2015 to 12 April 2015, and featured "pirates paradise" and the SANDF.

Merchandise
According to its website, the Rand Show offers products in one of its six categories: "Sports Expo, Kids Expo, Lifestyle Expo, Science & Tech Expo, Showcase SA and Outdoor Lifestyle Expo".

References

External links
 

Tourist attractions in Johannesburg
Easter traditions
Festivals in Johannesburg